Cerje is a village in the municipality of Bajina Bašta, Serbia.

Population 
According to the 2002 census, the village had a population of 168.

References

Populated places in Zlatibor District